Ifugao may refer to:

Ifugao, a province in the Philippines
Ifugao language
Ifugao people
Ifugao River
Ifugao (film), a 1954 Filipino film directed by Gerardo de León